Family Passions (German: Macht der Leidenschaft) was the first hour-long television serial produced in Canada and Germany.  It was produced and distributed by Baton Broadcasting System and ZDF between 1993 and 1994. In 1996, BBS stations replayed the entire series in a half-hour format.

Storylines
To assist with bringing in a German audience, the show went on location to Hamburg when a jewel thief and his lover (who had been in a coma for seven years and wanted revenge on the woman her husband had married in the meantime) stole the Dimarco diamond from a museum in that country.

Another milestone of this show was the exploration of a lesbian couple attempting to adopt a daughter whose biological mother was deemed unfit because of her addiction to cocaine.  Their attempts were thwarted when the child's biological father (who had been working as their butler) intervened.  This couple also frequently shared on screen kisses.  When the ABC Daytime serial All My Children did this ten years later, it made international news.

Family Passions featured popular soap actors such as Kin Shriner, Roscoe Born, Andrew Jackson and Gordon Thomson as well as many Canadian actors including future The Walking Dead actress Laurie Holden,  future Star Wars actor Hayden Christensen, Barry Flatman, Jennifer Dale, Jason Cadieux, Susan Hogan and Von Flores. Also German actors such as Dietmar Schönherr, Adelheid Arndt and Tina Ruland made an appearance on the show.

Main crew
 Jørn Winther
 Bruce Neckels
 Thom Racina
 Jack McAdam
 Alfie Kemp

External links
 

German television soap operas
Canadian television soap operas
1993 Canadian television series debuts
1994 Canadian television series endings
1990s Canadian drama television series
Television shows set in Germany
Television shows set in Canada
English-language television shows
1990s Canadian LGBT-related drama television series